K242CE (96.3 FM), branded as "Throwback 96.3", is a classic hip hop radio station translator, simulcasting 99.5 WRNO-FM HD-2 licensed to Meraux, Louisiana.

History
In February 2007, WYLD-FM 98.5 FM began broadcasting a smooth jazz format on its HD-2 frequency.

On August 1, 2012, the HD-2 frequency and translator of 98.5 FM WYLD-FM dropped its smooth jazz format for Top 40 (CHR) as "96.3 KISS FM." This marks the second time in this market that Clear Channel has used the Top 40 "KISS-FM" brand, which was last used at KSTE.

96.3 and 98.5 HD-2 KISS-FM airs radio personalities from other KISS-FM stations in the United States, and is jockless. The station does have local insertion of station identification, local commercials, and traffic reports.

On February 17, 2014, at noon, K242CE changed their format to active rock, branded as "Rock 96.3", relaying WRNO-FM HD2. The first song on Rock 96.3 was For Those About to Rock (We Salute You) by AC/DC. The change came a month after the previous active rock outlet in New Orleans, WRKN, flipped to country as "Nash FM 92.3".

On January 20, 2017, K242CE/WRNO-FM HD2 flipped to classic hip hop, branded as "Throwback 96.3."

Former programming
Elvis Duran and the Morning Show
On Air with Ryan Seacrest
Various personalities from other KISS-FM Clear Channel stations

References

External links
Official Website

K242CE
Radio stations established in 2007
2007 establishments in Louisiana
IHeartMedia radio stations
Classic hip hop radio stations in the United States